John T'Seleie (born September 11, 1950) is a territorial level politician. He served as a member of Canada's Northwest Territories Legislature from 1983 until 1987.

T'Seleie was first elected to the Northwest Territories Legislature, he won the electoral district of Sahtu in the 1983 Northwest Territories general election. He served one term and did not return when the assembly was dissolved in 1987.

T'Seleie is the former Executive Director of the Sahtu Land Use Planning Board and is currently employed as a Senior Negotiator for the Government of the Northwest Territories.

External links
Sahtu Land Use Planning Board Staff
Government of the Northwest Territories

Members of the Legislative Assembly of the Northwest Territories
Living people
1950 births